Big Day Out is an annual music festival.

Big Day Out may also refer to:

 Big Day Out, a children's book by Jacqueline Wilson
 Boolar's Big Day Out, a children's book by Sally Gardner
Blue Peter "Big Day Out Competition"

See also 
 Big Day (disambiguation)
 Big Gay Out, a non-profit LGBT fair day in Auckland, New Zealand